Balducci may refer to:

People

In arts and media
Alfredo Balducci (1920–2011), Italian playwright
Charlie Balducci (1975–2020), American actor
Ed Balducci (1906–1988), magician
Franco Balducci (1922–2001), Italian film actor
Giovanni Balducci, called Il Cosci (1560—1631), Florentine mannerist painter
Giuseppe Balducci (1796–1845), Italian composer
Lorenzo Balducci (born 1982), Italian actor
Michele Balducci, Italian actor
Pierluigi Balducci (born 1971), Italian jazz musician and composer
Richard Balducci (director) (1922–2015) French director, screenwriter and writer
Jason White (musician), guitarist

Clergy
Antonio Balducci, O.P. (died 1580), Roman Catholic prelate who served as Bishop of Trevico
Monsignor Corrado Balducci (1923–2008), Roman Catholic theologian of the Vatican Curia
Father Ernesto Balducci (1922–1992), Italian Roman Catholic priest and peace activist

In politics
Claudia Balducci, American politician from the state of Washington
Paola Balducci (born 1949), Italian politician and lawyer, former member of the CSM

In sport
Alex Balducci (born 1994), American football guard
Alice Balducci (born 1986), Italian tennis player
Daniele Balducci (born 1970), former professional tennis player from Italy
Francesca Balducci (born 1996), Italian professional racing cyclist
Gabriele Balducci, Italian professional racing cyclist, for the Acqua & Sapone-Caffè Mokambo team
Michela Balducci (born 1995), Italian professional racing cyclist

Fictional characters
"Balducci, bass role in Benvenuto Cellini (opera)

See also
Balducci's, American specialty-food retailer chain
Francesco Balducci Pegolotti (active 1310–1347), Florentine merchant and politician
Balducci levitation, an illusion first described by Ed Balducci

Italian-language surnames